Angel Comedy is a free comedy night that runs seven nights a week at two pub venues in London, England; above the Camden Head and in The Bill Murray. The club was founded by Barry Ferns, Sarah Pearce, Rachael Warnes and Dec Munro, and describes itself as "making comedy more accessible for audiences and comedians".

The Camden Head 

The comedy night was started in 2010 by comedian Barry Ferns as a weekly show with the intention of giving stage time to newer acts and allowing established professional comics to test new material. In 2012 the club was extended to run three nights per week. In April 2013, Angel Comedy held London's first week long free comedy festival, and then began running nightly.

The comedy night has hosted comedians including Dara Ó Briain, Tommy Tiernan, Eddie Izzard, Russell Howard, Daniel Simonsen and Holly Walsh. In January 2015, Ferns launched The Angel Comedy zine and podcast, featuring interviews with comedians who have performed at the club. Celia Pacquola was the first guest on the programme.

In February 2015, the club announced that it was collaborating with the US and Canadian comedy troupe The Second City and UK comedy blog Comedy Blogedy to bring Second City to the United Kingdom.

The Bill Murray 
In 2016 Angel Comedy launched a Kickstarter campaign to purchase and renovate a pub in Islington, a second space running on the same Angel Comedy Principle. The pub opened as The Bill Murray in 2017. Angel Comedy contacted comedian Bill Murray to seek his blessing for the pub's name, and in the absence of a response the pub is said to be officially named after William Murray, 1st Earl of Dysart.

The Bill Murray hosts Angel Comedy's workshops and courses, and serves as a place for comedians to test material with a more eclectic programme of shows. It is their base for future expansive projects.

References

Comedy clubs in the United Kingdom
Free goods and services